Sir William Mackworth Young  (15 August 1840 – 10 May 1924) was a member of the Indian Civil Service, who became Lieutenant-Governor of the Punjab 1897–1902.

Young was the son of Captain Sir George Young, 2nd Baronet. He attended Eton and King's College, in Cambridge, receiving a Bachelor of Arts degree in 1863 and a master of arts in 1866. Young joined the I.C.S. in Bengal in 1863, subsequently holding the title of Financial Commissioner of the Punjab from 1889 to 1895 and Lieutenant Governor of the Punjab 1897–1902. He stepped down in early March 1902, and left Bombay for the United Kingdom on 8 March 1902. He also briefly served as a vice-chancellor of University of the Punjab.

Young also served as a member of the Imperial Legislative Council in 1893.

His sons included Gerard Mackworth Young (1884-1965), Sir Hubert Winthrop Young (1885-1960), and Sir Mark Aitchison Young
(1886-1974).

References

Governors of Punjab (British India)
1924 deaths
Indian Civil Service (British India) officers
Members of the Imperial Legislative Council of India
1840 births
Knights Commander of the Order of the Star of India